Vine Grove is a home rule-class city in Hardin County, Kentucky, United States. The population was 4,520 at the 2010 census, up from 4,169 at the 2000 census. It is part of the Elizabethtown–Fort Knox Metropolitan Statistical Area.

Geography
Vine Grove is located in northern Hardin County at  (37.811971, -85.980006). It is bordered to the east by the city of Radcliff and to the northwest by Meade County. Kentucky Route 144 is the city's Main Street, and Kentucky Route 313 (Joe Prather Highway) runs through the northern part of the city.

The city is drained by the Brushy Fork, which flows west to Otter Creek, which flows north along the western edge of the city and is a tributary of the Ohio River.

Demographics

As of the census of 2000, there were 4,169 people, 1,619 households, and 1,160 families residing in the city. The racial makeup of the city was 83.31% White, 10.63% African American, 0.55% Native American, 1.73% Asian, 0.31% Pacific Islander, 1.20% from other races, and 2.28% from two or more races. Hispanic or Latino of any race were 3.02% of the population.

There were 1,619 households, out of which 37.4% had children under the age of 18 living with them, 55.9% were married couples living together, 12.2% had a female householder with no husband present, and 28.3% were non-families. 24.3% of all households were made up of individuals, and 10.7% had someone living alone who was 65 years of age or older. The average household size was 2.57 and the average family size was 3.07.

In the city, the population was spread out, with 27.6% under the age of 18, 7.5% from 18 to 24, 30.3% from 25 to 44, 23.1% from 45 to 64, and 11.6% who were 65 years of age or older. The median age was 37 years. For every 100 females, there were 92.5 males. For every 100 females age 18 and over, there were 87.2 males.

The median income for a household in the city was $38,581, and the median income for a family was $43,875. Males had a median income of $31,266 versus $24,634 for females. The per capita income for the city was $17,465. About 6.7% of families and 10.2% of the population were below the poverty line, including 14.7% of those under age 18 and 8.3% of those age 65 or over.

Government
Vine Grove uses a city council consisting of the city mayor and six members who are tasked with "making decisions on spending approval, budgets, ordinances and other issues that may affect the City." As of February 2020, the current mayor of Vine Grove is Pam Ogden.

Notable residents
 Nathan Adcock, Major League Baseball player; relief pitcher for the Kansas City Royals

References

External links
City of Vine Grove official website

Cities in Kentucky
Cities in Hardin County, Kentucky
Elizabethtown metropolitan area